Yang Yuying (born 11 May 1971) is a Chinese singer best known for her pop numbers The Heart Rain with Mao Ning, Tell You Lightly, Wind and Love, Water and Smile and Tao Hua Yun. Many people called Yang and Mao "The cutest boy and girl"().

Life
Yang Yuying born on 11 May 1971 at a village in Nanchang. When she was young, her father died. She lived with her mother and sister. She started singing on stage at the age of five. She was active in the Nanchang Children's Palace Choir in her childhood. Later, she won many awards in the singing competition.

In October 1990, she signed a contract with Guangzhou New Era Audio and Video Company to officially debut as a singer and became the first generation of Chinese singer. In the same year, she released her first solo album under the stage name “Yang Yuying”. She only sold 200,000 boxes at the Southern Audio and Video Group National Winter Order Fair held in Zhuhai in December of that year. As a newcomer, she set up a mainland singer. Unprecedented success has become an eye-catching star in the Chinese record industry.

On December 14, 1991, with the support of the record company, Yang Yuying boarded the stage of the "Gold and Silver List" column of CCTV's "Rotating Stage" column, sang the songs "Chashan Love Song" and "Wind Love, Water and Smile" and immediately triggered The craze, the 20-year-old Yang Yuying became a household star in the mainland, and became a household star in the mainland. Countless people saw her appearance on TV and heard her singing. In 1992, Yang Yuying's album "Wind and Love, Water and Smile" became the first album in the history of Chinese songs to be sold in the same year, which is a million-dollar original record. This has also become the mainland's original pop music. A landmark event in the audiovisual market situation.

In the early 1990s, Yang Yuying was very popular in China's music scene, especially with the singer Mao Ning's partner performance. It was hailed as "The Cutest Boy and Girl", and the two-part concert singer "The Heart Rain" has been widely sung. As one of the representative singers of the “Guangdong Pop Music” and “94 New Generation” in the pop music boom of mainland China, the great success of Yang Yuying’s singing career has established her important position in the history of Chinese pop music development.

In 1997, Yang Yuying suddenly announced that she was fading out of the singer's career, and the original record of the mainland's original record and the myth of Chinese native idol singers have not been broken and surpassed.

At the beginning of 2012, Yang Yuying returned to the stage again, still showing a strong market appeal, and the media attention and influence did not diminish. Since then, Yang Yuying has appeared frequently in public media and in commercial performances, and has been enthusiastically embraced by a large number of fans of all ages.

Yang Yuying was widely reported by the media as the singer with the highest sales volume in mainland China. As of 2012, its total sales of genuine albums reached more than 20 million. Considering that in the early 1990s, the development of the popular music and video industry in the mainland, the audiovisual market was monopolized by pirated publications, and the actual sales volume should be much higher than this, but the specific data is difficult to count.

Discography

Albums 
1990年 《90韩宝仪 爱我多深》(翻唱)
1990年 《为爱祝福》
1991年 《梦中花》
1992年 《风含情 水含笑》
1992年 《情歌伴舞》
1992年 《共醉共舞歌伴舞》
1993年 《月亮船》
1993年 《能有几次这样的爱》(work with Mao Ning)
1994年 《等你一万年》
1994年 《粤语金曲歌伴舞》
1995年 《因为有你》
1996年 《一片艳阳天》
1996年 《你带来一片温柔》
2000年 《故事》
2002年 《妈妈留给我一首歌》
2003年 《一段情》
2006年 《不了情》
2012年 《遇江南》

References 

1971 births
People from Nanchang
Living people
Chinese Mandopop singers
Singers from Jiangxi
20th-century Chinese women singers
21st-century Chinese women singers